Robert Buck may refer to:

Robert N. Buck (1914–2007), American aviator
Robert Otis Buck, model for Norman Rockwell's Willie Gillis World War II series
Rob Buck (1958–2000), musician with 10,000 Maniacs
Bob Buck (1938–1996), American sportscaster
Robbie Buck (born 1973), Australian radio announcer
Robert Creighton Buck (1920–1998), mathematician
Robert Sidney Buck, international footballer for Argentina and Uruguay